Danny Polfliet (born 31 May 1977), known professionally as Danny Vera, is a Dutch singer-songwriter and musician.

Career 
Danny Vera started his first band Till Dawn in 1999, with which he won the "Zeeuwse Belofte" award. He released his first solo album For the Light in Your Eyes in 2003.

In April 2009 Vera went to Hilltop Studios in Nashville, Tennessee to record his fourth album, Pink Flamingo.

Football pundit Johan Derksen's successful insistence that Danny Vera would play in his TV talkshows VI and Voetbal Inside launched Vera's musical career.

In 2019 his song "Roller Coaster" from his seventh album Pressure Makes Diamonds Part II finally hit the Dutch charts. One year later, the song went on to rank first in the annual Dutch Top 2000.

Personal life 
In the 2020 documentary Danny Vera: Van oma’s kelder tot Carré Vera said he hasn't eaten meat "for years".

Discography

Studio albums
 
|-
|style="text-align: left;"|For the Light in Your Eyes||2002||-||-||-||
|-
|style="text-align: left;"|Hold On a While ||April 12, 2005||-||-||-||
|-
|style="text-align: left;"|Ordinary Man ||August 31, 2007||-||-||-||
|-
|style="text-align: left;"|Pink Flamingo||September 11, 2009||-||-||-||
|-
|style="text-align: left;"|Distant Rumble||November 2, 2013||November 9, 2013||61||3||style="text-align: left;"|Live album
|-
|style="text-align: left;"|The New Black & White||October 9, 2014||November 9, 2014||100||1||
|-
|style="text-align: left;"|The New Black & White, PT. II||September 10, 2015||September 19, 2015||14||5||
|-
|style="text-align: left;"|The Outsider||September 1, 2016||September 10, 2016||5||5||
|-
|style="text-align: left;"|The New Black & White, PT. III||October 6, 2017||October 14, 2017||51||2||
|-
|style="text-align: left;"|Pressure Makes Diamonds 1 - The Year of the Snake||November 9, 2018||*||*||*||style="text-align: left;"|* see Pressure Makes Diamonds 1 & 2
|-
|style="text-align: left;"|Pressure Makes Diamonds 2 - Pompadour Hippie||February 15, 2019||*||*||*||style="text-align: left;"|* see Pressure Makes Diamonds 1 & 2
|-
|style="text-align: left;"|Pressure Makes Diamonds 1 & 2||February 15, 2019||February 23, 2019||4||180||style="text-align: left;"|Compilation album
|-
|style="text-align: left;"|Pressure Makes Diamonds||September 25, 2020||*||*||*||style="text-align: left;"|* see Pressure Makes Diamonds 1 & 2
|-
|style="text-align: left;"|The New Black and White, PT. IV - Home Recordings||August 28, 2020||September 5, 2020||21||2||
|-
|style="text-align: left;"|The New Now||November 13, 2020||November 21, 2020||1||32||
|-
|style="text-align: left;"|The New Black and White, PT. V||September 30, 2022||October 8, 2022||1||2||
|}

References

1977 births
Living people
Dutch singer-songwriters
Dutch male singers
Dutch male guitarists
People from Middelburg, Zeeland